Alive and Kicking is a Spanish television series created by Albert Espinosa for Movistar+. Based on the novel Lo que te diré cuando te vuelva a ver by Espinosa, the plot follows five teenagers escaping from a mental health centre. It aired in 2021.

Premise 
The fiction follows the mishaps of five teenagers (Mickey L'Angelo, Yeray, Guada, Samuel and Lucas) escaping from a mental health centre in Menorca, experiencing from then on a sort of road movie that takes them to different locations in Spain, Germany and Italy in search of Mickey's older brother.

Cast 
 Álvaro Requena as Mickey L'Angelo.
 Marco Sanz as Yeray.
 Sara Manzano as Guada.
 Aitor Valadés as Samuel.
 Héctor Pérez as Lucas.
 Miki Esparbé as Izan.
 Marta Torné as Elsa.
 Àlex Brendemühl as Dr. del Álamo.
 Bruno Sevilla as Dr. Sánchez.
 Andreu Benito
 Hanna Schygulla
 Rym Gallardo

Production and release 
Created by Albert Espinosa, Los espabilados is inspired by the novel Lo que te diré cuando te vuelva a ver, also authored by Espinosa. It consists of 7 episodes, directed by Roger Gual, featuring a running time of around 25 minutes. A 7-part road movie, the series is a drama with comedy elements. Filming started in Menorca on 4 November 2019. Movistar+ programmed the release of the first 3 episodes for 29 January 2021, and the release of the 4 remaining episodes on a 2 episodes per Friday basis. Before the series' release, Movistar+ tasked Espinosa with the writing of a second and final season, although the platform did not confirm the renovation at the time. The series' main theme, "Los espabilados", was composed and performed by Alfred García.

Reception 
The portrait of mental disorders in the series was harshly criticised by critics. Reported problematic aspects include the romanticization of illness and the "dangerous" underlying antidiagnostic thesis present in the series.

References 

Television shows set in the Balearic Islands
2020s Spanish drama television series
2021 Spanish television series debuts
Spanish-language television shows
Works about travel
Television series based on Spanish novels
Television shows filmed in Spain
Movistar+ network series